Warwickshire Nuffield Hospital is a not-for-profit private hospital situated in the north of Leamington Spa, Warwickshire, England.

History
The hospital was established in 1981 as a charitable trust and joined the Nuffield Hospitals group in 1994, which rebranded to Nuffield Health.

References

Hospital buildings completed in 1981
Hospitals in Warwickshire
Hospitals established in 1981
Buildings and structures in Leamington Spa
Private hospitals in the United Kingdom